Birsa Agricultural University is an agricultural university at Kanke, Ranchi in the Indian state of Jharkhand. It was established on 26 June 1981, after its formal inauguration by Prime Minister Indira Gandhi.

Overview
Its primary objective is to develop area specific technologies and manpower in the fields of agriculture, animal husbandry and forestry for the development of the plateau region of Bihar and Jharkhand. In addition, economic uplifting of tribal and other backward class population of the region is a priority. The programmes and activities of education, research and extension are carried out through various faculties.

Faculties
Faculty of Agriculture
Faculty of Veterinary Science & Animal Husbandry
Faculty of Forestry
Faculty of Dairy Technology
Faculty of fisheries science
Faculty of Horticulture
Faculty of Biotechnology (PG)
Faculty of agribusiness management (PG)

Colleges 
Ranchi Agriculture College, Ranchi (1955)
Ranchi Veterinary College (1961)
College of forestry, Ranchi (1981)
College of Bio-Technology, Ranchi
College of Fisheries Science, Gumla
Rabindra Nath Tagore Agriculture College, Deoghar
Agriculture College, Garhwa
Tilka Manjhi Agriculture College, Godda
College of Horticulture, Chaibasa
College of Agricultural Engineering, Ranchi
Phulo-Jhano Murmu College of Dairy Technology.
Departments-
•Dairy Technology
•Dairy Engineering
•Dairy Microbiology
•Dairy Chemistry
•Dairy Business Management

Centre of Agribusiness Management, Ranchi

Ranchi Agriculture College was established in 1955. It was the second oldest agriculture college after Bihar Agriculture College in Sarbour at the time of undivided Bihar. This college was under Ranchi University until the formation of Ranjendra Prashad Agricultural University in Pusa in 1971. On 26 June 1981, it was transferred to Birsa Agricultural University in Kanke. The college is located where the Tropic of Cancer passes through it in Kanke. Its location stands 85°19' E longitude and 23°17'N latitude.

The Jharkhand Combined Entrance Competitive Examination Board (JCECEB) conducts the exam for admission of BSc (Ag), BVSc&AH, BSc (Forestry), BTech (Agriculture Engineering), BTech (Dairy Technology). In Ranchi Agriculture College, there are 105 seats, of which 85% are for state quota and 15% for ICAR.

See also 
Birsa College, Khunti
Birsa Institute of Technology Sindri

External links
 

Agricultural universities and colleges in India
Memorials to Birsa Munda
Agriculture in Jharkhand
Universities and colleges in Jharkhand

1981 establishments in Bihar
Educational institutions established in 1981
State universities in Jharkhand